Scatter the Rats is a studio album by American rock band L7, released on May 3, 2019 through Blackheart Records. It is the band's first album in almost 20 years, following the band's 2014 reunion. It has received positive reviews.

Recording and release
Scatter the Rats is the first L7 studio album in 20 years and was recorded with Norm Block and Nick Launay at Happy Ending Studios and Sunset Sound in Los Angeles, California, United States. It was preceded by the singles "Burn Baby" on February 28 and "Stadium West" on April 22. The band announced a 21-date tour to support the release, covering the United States in mid-2019. The release follows the band reforming in 2014 and releasing the non-album singles "Dispatch from Mar-a-Largo" in 2017 and "I Came Back to Bitch" in 2018.

Reception

Pitchfork Media gave the album a 6.6; Dayna Evans' review criticized the lyrics on one track, "Murky Water Cafe", as ("lines that resort to cliché or grab at low-hanging cultural fruit feel not only dated, but cringeworthy") and musicianship ("They sell themselves short by assuming they were just another meat-and-potatoes rock band, and on Scatter the Rats’ weakest moments, they actually sound like one."). Neil Z. Yeung of AllMusic gave Scatter the Rats 3.5 out of five stars, writing that they are "cramming crunchy guitars and lurching rhythms into an updated stew of nasty punkabilly bounce, heavy metal muscle, and no-frills rock & roll" while stating that L7 "still snarl and pack a vicious punch".

Rolling Stone praised the album citing the strength of the band's "pile-driving guitar riffs and quirky ear candy." LA Weekly singled out the song "Stadium West" as "classic L7: punk fuzz and drone, with spit and fire in all the right places". Exclaim!s review from Zahraa Hmood gave the album a seven out of 10 but criticized it for being inconsistent, with immature songwriting in the middle tracks. James Thornhill of Under the Radar gave a middling five out of 10, praising the guitar work and punk attitude of select tracks but noting that this is a weak outing for an iconic punk band and that the songwriting here does not live up to their 2017 and 2018 reunion singles.

Track listing
"Burn Baby" (Donita Sparks) – 2:31
"Fighting the Crave" (Suzi Gardner, Sparks) – 3:22
"Proto Prototype" (Gardner, Sparks) – 3:12
"Stadium West" (Sparks) – 3:43
"Murky Water Cafe" (Gardner) – 4:00
"Ouija Board Lies" (Sparks) – 2:59
"Garbage Truck" (Jennifer Finch) – 2:27
"Holding Pattern" (Sparks) – 3:06
"Uppin' the Ice" (Sparks) – 3:33
"Cool About Easy" (Gardner) – 3:22
"Scatter the Rats" (Finch, Gardner, Demetra Plakas, Sparks) – 4:27

Personnel
L7
Jennifer Finch – bass guitar, vocals 
Suzi Gardner – guitar, vocals
Demetra Plakas – drums, vocals
Donita Sparks – vocals, guitar

Other personnel
Norm Block – production
Nick Launay – production

References

External links

2019 albums
Albums produced by Nick Launay
Blackheart Records albums
L7 (band) albums